Jackson Carman (born January 22, 2000) is an American football guard  for the Cincinnati Bengals of the National Football League (NFL). He played college football at Clemson, and was drafted by the Bengals in the second round of the 2021 NFL Draft.

Early life and high school
Carman grew up in Fairfield, Ohio and attended Fairfield High School. He played along Michigan’s Erik All (TE) and Cincinnati’s Malik Vann (DE). Carman was rated a five-star recruit and the best collegiate prospect in Ohio by 247Sports, ESPN and Rivals. He committed to play college football at Clemson over offers from Ohio State and USC.

College career
Carman played in 13 games as a true freshman, playing 209 total snaps as the Tigers won the 2018 National Championship. As a sophomore, Carman was named the Tigers' starting left tackle and started all 15 of Clemson's games and was named third-team All-Atlantic Coast Conference. Carman was named to the Outland Trophy watchlist going into his junior season.  Carman started all 12 games of his Junior season and was named second-team All-ACC.  On January 6, 2021, he announced that he would forgo his senior year and enter the draft.

Professional career

Carman was selected by the Cincinnati Bengals in the second round (46th overall) of the 2021 NFL Draft. On May 18, 2021, Carman signed his four-year rookie contract with Cincinnati. Third-year veteran Jonah Williams remained the Bengals' starting left tackle, but the team found a place for Carman at right guard. He played all 17 games for Cincinnati in his rookie season, starting in six of them, and played in all four of the Bengals postseason games as well.

In 2022, Cincinnati signed free agent guard Alex Cappa and drafted guard Cordell Volson in the fourth round of the NFL Draft. Cappa was immediately assigned to play right guard, and Volson beat out Carman for the starting left guard position, leaving Carman on the bench. However, when multiple injuries befell the Bengals late in the season, the team called on Carman to replace Williams at the left tackle position for the second half of its playoff win against Baltimore. In a highly anticipated matchup with the Buffalo Bills in the Divisional Round, Carman and the patchwork offensive line put together a strong performance, generating 172 team rushing yards and allowing just one quarterback sack in a 27-10 win.

References

External links 
Cincinnati Bengals bio
Clemson Tigers bio

2000 births
Living people
People from Fairfield, Ohio
Players of American football from Ohio
Sportspeople from the Cincinnati metropolitan area
American football offensive tackles
Clemson Tigers football players
Cincinnati Bengals players